Crailing is a village on the A698, in Teviotdale, 4m east of Jedburgh in the Scottish Borders area of Scotland, in the historic county of Roxburghshire.

Places nearby include Ancrum, Crailinghall, Eckford, Hownam, Kelso, Nisbet, Roxburghshire, the Oxnam Water, the River Teviot.

Notable people and events
Robert Aitken (preacher) (1800—1873)
Thomas Oliver (architect) (1791—1857)
 Crailing played an important role in the early history of Clan Oliphant. Sir David Olifard, who is commonly held to be the progenitor of the clan, in 1141 got lands at Crailing from King David I of Scotland whose life Olifard had saved.
Rory Bremner bought Crailing House near Jedburgh in September in 2009.

See also
List of places in the Scottish Borders
List of places in Scotland

References

 1952 Hawick Archaeological Society 1952 transactions: Walter Brydon, Crailing and its associations, pp 7–8

External links

CANMORE/RCAHMS record of Crailing House, Old Burial Ground, Crailing Churchyard
National Archives of Scotland: Parish of Crailing
RCAHMS record of Crailing Tofts
British Listed Buildings: West Lodge, Crailing House, Crailing
BBC, WW2 People's War: Article ID: A6204502

Villages in the Scottish Borders
Parishes in Roxburghshire